The First sunrise refers to the custom of observing the first sunrise of the year. Such a custom may be just an observation of the sunrise on a special day, just for fun, or has a religious meaning for those who worship the sun, such as the Shintoist followers in Japan and the Inuit, Yupik, Aleut, Chukchi and the Iñupiat in the Arctic Circle, for praying for good luck.

Japan
In Japan, the observation of the first sunrise of the year on the first day on the Old Calendar has been part of the traditional Shintoist worship of Amaterasu, the sun goddess. Nowadays, the Japanese travel agents arrange trips to observe the earliest first sunrise of the year on the new Gregorian calendar in the easternmost Ogasawara Islands of the Japanese archipelago.

Mongolia
In Mongolia, there is a custom of observing the first sunrise on the first day of the year at the top of the mountain the Mongolian lunisolar calendar. commonly known as Tsagaan Sar. The holiday has shamanistic influences.

Korea
In Korea, there is also a custom of observing the first sunrise on the first day of the year, either on the traditional Korean calendar or the new calendar.

Canada, Greenland, Russia and the United States

In the Arctic circle, the Inuit, Yupik, Aleut, Chukchi and the Iñupiat observe the first sunrise on the first day of the year by extinguishing three qulliqs and relighting them to worship both Malina and Igaluk.

See also  
Sunrise
Japanese New Year
Quviasukvik

References

External links

Solar phenomena
January
January observances
New Year in Japan
Korean culture
Eskimo culture
New Year in Canada
New Year in Russia
New Year in the United States